Ecological succession is the process of change in the species structure of an ecological community over time. The time scale can be decades (for example, after a wildfire) or more or less.

Bacteria allows for the cycling of nutrients such as carbon, nitrogen and sulphur. 

The community begins with relatively few pioneering plants and animals and develops through increasing complexity until it becomes stable or self-perpetuating as a climax community. The "engine" of succession, the cause of ecosystem change, is the impact of established organisms upon their own environments. A consequence of living is the sometimes subtle and sometimes overt alteration of one's own environment.

Succession is a process by which an ecological community undergoes more or less orderly and predictable changes following a disturbance or the initial colonization of a new habitat. Succession may be initiated either by formation of new, unoccupied habitat, such as from a lava flow or a severe landslide, or by some form of disturbance of a community, such as from a fire, severe windthrow, or logging. Succession that begins in new habitats, uninfluenced by pre-existing communities is called primary succession, whereas succession that follows disruption of a pre-existing community is called secondary succession.

Succession was among the first theories advanced in ecology. Ecological succession was first documented in the Indiana Dunes of Northwest Indiana and remains an important ecological topic of study.

History 
Precursors of the idea of ecological succession go back to the beginning of the 19th century. As early as 1742 French naturalist Buffon noted that poplars precede oaks and beeches in the natural evolution of a forest. Buffon was later forced by the theological committee at the University of Paris to recant many of his ideas because they contradicted the biblical narrative of Creation. 

Swiss geologist Jean-André De)luc and the later French naturalist Adolphe Dureau de la Malle were the first to make use of the word succession concerning the vegetation development after forest clear-cutting. In 1859 Henry David Thoreau wrote an address called "The Succession of Forest Trees" in which he described succession in an oak-pine forest. "It has long been known to observers that squirrels bury nuts in the ground, but I am not aware that any one has thus accounted for the regular succession of forests." The Austrian botanist Anton Kerner published a study about the succession of plants in the Danube river basin in 1863.

Ragnar Hult's 1885 study on the stages of forest development in Blekinge noted that grassland becomes heath before the heath develops into forest. Birch dominated the early stages of forest development, then pine (on dry soil) and spruce (on wet soil). If the birch is replaced by oak it eventually develops to beechwood. Swamps proceed from moss to sedges to moor vegetation followed by birch and finally spruce.

H. C. Cowles
 Between 1899-1910, Henry Chandler Cowles, at the University of Chicago, developed a more formal concept of succession. Inspired by studies of Danish dunes by Eugen Warming, Cowles studied vegetation development on sand dunes on the shores of Lake Michigan (the Indiana Dunes). He recognized that vegetation on dunes of different ages might be interpreted as different stages of a general trend of vegetation development on dunes (an approach to the study of vegetation change later termed space-for-time substitution, or chronosequence studies). He first published this work as a paper in the Botanical Gazette in 1899 ("The ecological relations of the vegetation of the sand dunes of Lake Michigan"). In this classic publication and subsequent papers, he formulated the idea of primary succession and the notion of a sere—a repeatable sequence of community changes specific to particular environmental circumstances.

Gleason and Clements
From about 1900 to 1960, however, understanding of succession was dominated by the theories of Frederic Clements, a contemporary of Cowles, who held that seres were highly predictable and deterministic and converged on a climatically determined stable climax community regardless of starting conditions. Clements explicitly analogized the successional development of ecological communities with ontogenetic development of individual organisms, and his model is often referred to as the pseudo-organismic theory of community ecology. Clements and his followers developed a complex taxonomy of communities and successional pathways.

Henry Gleason offered a contrasting framework as early as the 1920s. The Gleasonian model was more complex and much less deterministic than the Clementsian. It differs most fundamentally from the Clementsian view in suggesting a much greater role of chance factors and in denying the existence of coherent, sharply bounded community types. Gleason argued that species distributions responded individualistically to environmental factors, and communities were best regarded as artifacts of the juxtaposition of species distributions. Gleason's ideas, first published in 1926, were largely ignored until the late 1950s.

Two quotes illustrate the contrasting views of Clements and Gleason. Clements wrote in 1916:

while Gleason, in his 1926 paper, said:

Gleason's ideas were, in fact, more consistent with Cowles' original thinking about succession. About Clements' distinction between primary succession and secondary succession, Cowles wrote (1911):

Modern era
A more rigorous, data-driven testing of successional models and community theory generally began with the work of Robert Whittaker and John Curtis in the 1950s and 1960s. Succession theory has since become less monolithic and more complex. J. Connell and R. Slatyer attempted a codification of successional processes by mechanism. Among British and North American ecologists, the notion of a stable climax vegetation has been largely abandoned, and successional processes have come to be seen as much less deterministic, with important roles for historical contingency and for alternate pathways in the actual development of communities. Debates continue as to the general predictability of successional dynamics and the relative importance of equilibrial vs. non-equilibrial processes. Former Harvard professor Fakhri A. Bazzaz introduced the notion of scale into the discussion, as he considered that at local or small area scale the processes are stochastic and patchy, but taking bigger regional areas into consideration, certain tendencies can not be denied.

Factors

The trajectory of successional change can be influenced by site conditions, by the character of the events initiating succession (perturbations), by the interactions of the species present, and by more stochastic factors such as availability of colonists or seeds or weather conditions at the time of disturbance. Some of these factors contribute to predictability of succession dynamics; others add more probabilistic elements. Two important perturbation factors today are human actions and climatic change.

In general, communities in early succession will be dominated by fast-growing, well-dispersed species (opportunist, fugitive, or r-selected life-histories). As succession proceeds, these species will tend to be replaced by more competitive (k-selected) species.

Trends in ecosystem and community properties in succession have been suggested, but few appear to be general. For example, species diversity almost necessarily increases during early succession as new species arrive, but may decline in later succession as competition eliminates opportunistic species and leads to dominance by locally superior competitors. Net Primary Productivity, biomass, and trophic properties all show variable patterns over succession, depending on the particular system and site.

Ecological succession was formerly seen as having a stable end-stage called the climax, sometimes referred to as the 'potential vegetation' of a site, and shaped primarily by the local climate. This idea has been largely abandoned by modern ecologists in favor of nonequilibrium ideas of ecosystems dynamics. Most natural ecosystems experience disturbance at a rate that makes a "climax" community unattainable. Climate change often occurs at a rate and frequency sufficient to prevent arrival at a climax state. Additions to available species pools through range expansions and introductions can also continually reshape communities.

The development of some ecosystem attributes, such as soil properties and nutrient cycles, are both influenced by community properties, and, in turn, influence further successional development. This feed-back process may occur only over centuries or millennia. Coupled with the stochastic nature of disturbance events and other long-term (e.g., climatic) changes, such dynamics make it doubtful whether the 'climax' concept ever applies or is particularly useful in considering actual vegetation.

Types

Primary succession

Successional dynamics beginning with colonization of an area that has not been previously occupied by an ecological community are referred to as primary succession. This includes newly exposed rock or sand surfaces, lava flows, and newly exposed glacial tills. The stages of primary succession include pioneer microorganisms, plants (lichens and mosses), grassy stage, smaller shrubs, and trees. Animals begin to return when there is food there for them to eat. When it is a fully functioning ecosystem, it has reached the climax community stage.

Secondary succession

Secondary succession follows severe disturbance or removal of a preexisting community that has remnants of the previous ecosystem. Secondary succession is strongly influenced by pre-disturbance conditions such as soil development, seed banks, remaining organic matter, and residual living organisms. Because of residual fertility and preexisting organisms, community change in early stages of secondary succession can be relatively rapid.

Secondary succession is much more commonly observed and studied than primary succession. Particularly common types of secondary succession include responses to natural disturbances such as fire, flood, and severe winds, and to human-caused disturbances such as logging and agriculture. In secondary succession, the soils and organisms need to be left unharmed so there is a way for the new material to rebuild.

As an example, in a fragmented old field habitat created in eastern Kansas, woody plants "colonized more rapidly (per unit area) on large and nearby patches".

Secondary succession can quickly change a landscape. In the 1900s, Acadia National Park had a wildfire that destroyed much of the landscape. Originally evergreen trees grew in the landscape. After the fire, the area took at least a year to grow shrubs. Eventually, deciduous trees started to grow instead of evergreens.

Secondary succession has been occurring in Shenandoah National Park following the 1995 flood of the Moorman's and Rapidan rivers, which destroyed plant and animal life.

Seasonal and cyclic dynamics

Unlike secondary succession, these types of vegetation change are not dependent on disturbance but are periodic changes arising from fluctuating species interactions or recurring events. These models modify the climax concept towards one of dynamic states.

Causes of plant succession

Autogenic succession can be brought by changes in the soil caused by the organisms there. These changes include accumulation of organic matter in litter or humic layer, alteration of soil nutrients, or change in the pH of soil due to the plants growing there. The structure of the plants themselves can also alter the community. For example, when larger species like trees mature, they produce shade on to the developing forest floor that tends to exclude light-requiring species. Shade-tolerant species will invade the area.

Allogenic succession is caused by external environmental influences and not by the vegetation. For example, soil changes due to erosion, leaching or the deposition of silt and clays can alter the nutrient content and water relationships in the ecosystems. Animals also play an important role in allogenic changes as they are pollinators, seed dispersers and herbivores. They can also increase nutrient content of the soil in certain areas, or shift soil about (as termites, ants, and moles do) creating patches in the habitat. This may create regeneration sites that favor certain species.

Climatic factors may be very important, but on a much longer time-scale than any other. Changes in temperature and rainfall patterns will promote changes in communities. As the climate warmed at the end of each ice age, great successional changes took place. The tundra vegetation and bare glacial till deposits underwent succession to mixed deciduous forest. The greenhouse effect resulting in increase in temperature is likely to bring profound Allogenic changes in the next century. Geological and climatic catastrophes such as volcanic eruptions, earthquakes, avalanches, meteors, floods, fires, and high wind also bring allogenic changes.

Mechanisms

In 1916, Frederic Clements published a descriptive theory of succession and advanced it as a general ecological concept. His theory of succession had a powerful influence on ecological thought. Clements' concept is usually termed classical ecological theory.
According to Clements, succession is a process involving several phases:

 Nudation: Succession begins with the development of a bare site, called Nudation (disturbance).
 Migration: refers to arrival of propagules.
 Ecesis: involves establishment and initial growth of vegetation.
 Competition: as vegetation becomes well established, grows, and spreads, various species begin to compete for space, light and nutrients.
 Reaction: during this phase autogenic changes such as the buildup of humus affect the habitat, and one plant community replaces another.
 Stabilization: a supposedly stable climax community forms.

Seral communities

A seral community is an intermediate stage found in an ecosystem advancing towards its climax community. In many cases more than one seral stage evolves until climax conditions are attained. A prisere is a collection of seres making up the development of an area from non-vegetated surfaces to a climax community. Depending on the substratum and climate, different seres are found.

Changes in animal life
Succession theory was developed primarily by botanists. The study of succession applied to whole ecosystems initiated in the writings of Ramon Margalef, while Eugene Odum's publication of The Strategy of Ecosystem Development is considered its formal starting point.

Animal life also exhibits changes with changing communities. In the lichen stage, fauna is sparse. It comprises a few mites, ants, and spiders living in cracks and crevices. The fauna undergoes a qualitative increase during the herb grass stage. The animals found during this stage include nematodes, insect larvae, ants, spiders, mites, etc. The animal population increases and diversifies with the development of the forest climax community. The fauna consists of invertebrates like slugs, snails, worms, millipedes, centipedes, ants, bugs; and vertebrates such as squirrels, foxes, mice, moles, snakes, various birds, salamanders and frogs.

Microsuccession

Succession of micro-organisms including fungi and bacteria occurring within a microhabitat is known as microsuccession or serule. In artificial bacterial meta-communities of motile strains on-chip it has been shown that ecological succession is based on a trade-off between colonization and competition abilities. To exploit locations or explore the landscape?  Escherichia coli is a fugitive species, whereas Pseudomonas aeruginosa is a slower colonizer but superior competitor.  Like in plants, microbial succession can occur in newly available habitats (primary succession) such as surfaces of plant leaves, recently exposed rock surfaces (i.e., glacial till) or animal infant guts, and also on disturbed communities (secondary succession) like those growing in recently dead trees, decaying fruits, or animal droppings. Microbial communities may also change due to products secreted by the bacteria present. Changes of pH in a habitat could provide ideal conditions for a new species to inhabit the area. In some cases the new species may outcompete the present ones for nutrients leading to the primary species demise. Changes can also occur by microbial succession with variations in water availability and temperature. Theories of macroecology have only recently been applied to microbiology and so much remains to be understood about this growing field. A recent study of microbial succession evaluated the balances between stochastic and deterministic processes in the bacterial colonization of a salt marsh chronosequence. The results of this study show that, much like in macro succession, early colonization (primary succession) is mostly influenced by stochasticity while secondary succession of these bacterial communities was more strongly influenced by deterministic factors.

Climax concept
According to classical ecological theory, succession stops when the sere has arrived at an equilibrium or steady state with the physical and biotic environment. Barring major disturbances, it will persist indefinitely. This end point of succession is called climax.

Climax community

The final or stable community in a sere is the climax community or climatic vegetation. It is self-perpetuating and in equilibrium with the physical habitat. There is no net annual accumulation of organic matter in a climax community. The annual production and use of energy is balanced in such a community.

Characteristics

 The vegetation is tolerant of environmental conditions.
 It has a wide diversity of species, a well-drained spatial structure, and complex food chains.
 The climax ecosystem is balanced. There is equilibrium between gross primary production and total respiration, between energy used from sunlight and energy released by decomposition, between uptake of nutrients from the soil and the return of nutrient by litter fall to the soil.
 Individuals in the climax stage are replaced by others of the same kind. Thus the species composition maintains equilibrium.
 It is an index of the climate of the area. The life or growth forms indicate the climatic type.

Types of climax

 Climatic Climax If there is only a single climax and the development of climax community is controlled by the climate of the region, it is termed as climatic climax. For example, development of Maple-beech climax community over moist soil. Climatic climax is theoretical and develops where physical conditions of the substrate are not so extreme as to modify the effects of the prevailing regional climate.
 Edaphic Climax When there are more than one climax communities in the region, modified by local conditions of the substrate such as soil moisture, soil nutrients, topography, slope exposure, fire, and animal activity, it is called edaphic climax. Succession ends in an edaphic climax where topography, soil, water, fire, or other disturbances are such that a climatic climax cannot develop.
 Catastrophic Climax Climax vegetation vulnerable to a catastrophic event such as a wildfire. For example, in California, chaparral vegetation is the final vegetation. The wildfire removes the mature vegetation and decomposers. A rapid development of herbaceous vegetation follows until the shrub dominance is re-established. This is known as catastrophic climax.
 Disclimax When a stable community, which is not the climatic or edaphic climax for the given site, is maintained by man or his domestic animals, it is designated as Disclimax (disturbance climax) or anthropogenic subclimax (man-generated). For example, overgrazing by stock may produce a desert community of bushes and cacti where the local climate actually would allow grassland to maintain itself.
 Subclimax The prolonged stage in succession just preceding the climatic climax is subclimax.
 Preclimax and Postclimax In certain areas different climax communities develop under similar climatic conditions. If the community has life forms lower than those in the expected climatic climax, it is called preclimax; a community that has life forms higher than those in the expected climatic climax is postclimax. Preclimax strips develop in less moist and hotter areas, whereas Postclimax strands develop in more moist and cooler areas than that of surrounding climate.

Theories

There are three schools of interpretations explaining the climax concept:

 Monoclimax or Climatic Climax Theory was advanced by Clements (1916) and recognizes only one climax whose characteristics are determined solely by climate (climatic climax). The processes of succession and modification of environment overcome the effects of differences in topography, parent material of the soil, and other factors. The whole area would be covered with uniform plant community. Communities other than the climax are related to it, and are recognized as subclimax, postclimax and disclimax.
 Polyclimax Theory was advanced by Tansley (1935). It proposes that the climax vegetation of a region consists of more than one vegetation climaxes controlled by soil moisture, soil nutrients, topography, slope exposure, fire, and animal activity.
 Climax Pattern Theory was proposed by Whittaker (1953). The climax pattern theory recognizes a variety of climaxes governed by responses of species populations to biotic and abiotic conditions. According to this theory the total environment of the ecosystem determines the composition, species structure, and balance of a climax community. The environment includes the species' responses to moisture, temperature, and nutrients, their biotic relationships, availability of flora and fauna to colonize the area, chance dispersal of seeds and animals, soils, climate, and disturbance such as fire and wind. The nature of climax vegetation will change as the environment changes. The climax community represents a pattern of populations that corresponds to and changes with the pattern of environment. The central and most widespread community is the climatic climax.

The theory of alternative stable states suggests there is not one end point but many which transition between each other over ecological time.

Forest succession

Forests, being an ecological system, are subject to the species succession process. There are "opportunistic" or "pioneer" species that produce great quantities of seed that are disseminated by the wind, and therefore can colonize big empty extensions. They are capable of germinating and growing in direct sunlight. Once they have produced a closed canopy, the lack of direct sun radiation at the soil makes it difficult for their own seedlings to develop. It is then the opportunity for shade-tolerant species to become established under the protection of the pioneers. When the pioneers die, the shade-tolerant species replace them. These species are capable of growing beneath the canopy, and therefore, in the absence of disturbances, will stay. For this reason it is then said the stand has reached its climax. When a disturbance occurs, the opportunity for the pioneers opens up again, provided they are present or within a reasonable range.

An example of pioneer species, in forests of northeastern North America are Betula papyrifera (White birch) and Prunus serotina (Black cherry), that are particularly well-adapted to exploit large gaps in forest canopies, but are intolerant of shade and are eventually replaced by other shade-tolerant species in the absence of disturbances that create such gaps. In the tropics, well known pioneer forest species can be found among the genera Cecropia, Ochroma and Trema.

Things in nature are not black and white, and there are intermediate stages. It is therefore normal that between the two extremes of light and shade there is a gradient, and there are species that may act as pioneer or tolerant, depending on the circumstances. It is of paramount importance to know the tolerance of species in order to practice an effective silviculture.

See also 

 Connell–Slatyer model of ecological succession
 Cyclic succession
 Ecological stability
 Intermediate disturbance hypothesis

References

Further reading

External links 

 Science Aid: Succession Explanation of succession for high school students.
 Biographical sketch of Henry Chandler Cowles.
 Robbert Murphy sees a significantly ideological, rather than scientific, basis for the disfavour shown towards succession by the current ecological orthodoxy and seeks to reinstate succession by holistic and teleological argument.

 
Ecological processes
Biology terminology
Environmental terminology
Habitat